Scalenghe is a comune (municipality) in the Metropolitan City of Turin in the Italian region of Piedmont, about  southwest of Turin.

Scalenghe borders the following municipalities: None, Pinerolo, Airasca, Piscina, Castagnole Piemonte, Buriasco, and Cercenasco.

Twin towns — sister cities
Scalenghe is twinned with:

  Vila, Argentina
  Žlobin, Belarus

References

Cities and towns in Piedmont